Edwin  Norris (24 October 1795 – 10 December 1872) was a British philologist, linguist and intrepid orientalist who wrote or compiled numerous works on the languages of Asia and Africa. His best-known works are his uncompleted Assyrian Dictionary and his translation and annotation of the three plays of the Cornish Ordinalia.

Description
Norris was born in Taunton, Somerset, England, on 24 October 1795 and served as a Clerk for the East India House and was also an assistant secretary in the Royal Asiatic Society during the 1830s. He translated and annotated the Cornish language manuscript from the Middle Ages known as the 'three plays of the Ordinalia' which is one of the most important relics of the Celtic dialect of Cornish (published in 1859 by the Oxford University Press as Ancient Cornish Drama): it is one of the more recognized aspects of his work.

E. Norris also worked on Assyrian culture with major contributions. He deciphered the Assyrian lion weights from Nineveh and he discovered the weight measurement system of this civilisation and established conversions in 1853 and started the Assyrian Dictionary. This uncompleted work is one of his more well known works outside Cornwall and widely considered a landmark in the history of cuneiform. The work was meant to further the study of the cuneiform inscriptions of Assyria and Babylonia but was unfinished at the time of his death in 1872.

Works

 (Reissued in 2 vols.:- New York; London: Benjamin Blom, 1968)
 (part of The Ancient Cornish Drama, vol. 2)
 (Contains A-Nst; no more published. Reissued by Adamant Media Corporation, 2004 ISBNs 1421262886, 1421262878, 142126286X)

References

1795 births
1872 deaths
English philologists
Linguists from England
English Assyriologists
People from Taunton
Cornish language
Cornish-speaking people
Assyriologists